Aguiarnópolis is a municipality located in the Brazilian state of Tocantins. Its population was 6,892 (2020) and its area is 235 km².

References

Municipalities in Tocantins